Police Sports Club may refer to:

 Al-Shorta SC (Iraq)
 Al-Shorta SC (Syria)
 Police SC Qatar – professional Volleyball team (Doha, Qatar)
 Sri Lanka Police Sports Club (cricket)
 Sri Lanka Police Sports Club (football)
 Sri Lanka Police Sports Club (rugby)